What You Need is a song by American producer and DJ Powerhouse featuring Duane Harden. It was released in May 1999 as a single and reached to number-one on the US Billboard Hot Dance Music/Club Play chart. There was also a first song to be played on Galaxy 105-106. It peaked at #13 in the UK Singles Chart. The track was remixed by Full Intention.

Content
The song sampled Thelma Houston's "I'm Here Again".

Charts

See also
List of number-one dance hits (United States)
List of artists who reached number one on the US Dance chart

References

External links
Lenny Fontana Website

1999 singles
1999 songs
Electronic songs
House music songs
Songs written by Duane Harden